Lepidodactylus zweifeli is a species of gecko. It is endemic to New Guinea and is known from the Adelbert Mountains in Madang Province, Papua New Guinea. It is named for Richard G. Zweifel, an American herpetologist.

References

Lepidodactylus
Geckos of New Guinea
Reptiles of Papua New Guinea
Endemic fauna of New Guinea
Endemic fauna of Papua New Guinea
Reptiles described in 2019
Taxa named by Edward Frederick Kraus